Christian Hafenecker (born 11 August 1980) is an Austrian politician who has been a member of the National Council for the Freedom Party (FPÖ) since 2013. He was also a former Member of the Federal Council. Since 2018 he is (together with Harald Vilimsky) one of the secretaries-general of his party.

References

1980 births
Living people
People from Mödling
Members of the National Council (Austria)
Freedom Party of Austria politicians